The valley of the West Fork Foss River contains a fair amount of waterfalls. The river heads in a series of large lakes: Big Heart Lake, Angeline Lake, and Otter Lake- which form spectacular waterfalls as they plunge down to Delta Lake. On the valley walls downstream of Delta Lake, are found even more waterfalls.

There are a series of waterfalls occurring on the cliff where Malachite Lake and Copper Lake's outlet streams plunge down to meet the West Fork Foss River, in King County, Washington. This cliff drops thousands of feet into the basin of the West Fork, forming two sets of five waterfalls total. Two other waterfalls also drop down the cliff further downstream along the drainage. There are also some waterfalls on the West Fork itself.

Copper/Malachite Lakes Headwall
Waterfalls on the cliff separating the lakes and the West Fork below include Malachite Falls, Copper Lake Falls, and the Upper, Middle, and Lower Copper Falls. All these waterfalls are on a watercourse informally named Copper Creek. Falls are arranged proceeding downstream.

Copper Lake Falls

The two lower drops probably disappear into the talus they cascade over during lower stream flows, but the upper tier flows over rock hard enough to sustain it all year. The falls flows best from April to July.

The falls is found about  further on the trail from the viewpoint of Malachite Falls.

Malachite Falls

Despite the grand size of the falls, only portions of it are visible from any given spot, though the falls is visible for about  along the West Fork Foss Trail (#1062). The segment of the falls that flows from Copper Lake is easiest to see, while the segment from Malachite Lake is more difficult to see. The falls' best flows are from May to August. 

The falls is reached by the West Fork Foss Trail #1062.

Upper Copper Falls

Upper Copper Falls is the first of the three Copper Falls along Copper Creek. One segment of the falls probably dries up during lower stream flows, as it most probably cascades over talus. The falls' best flows are perennial.

Below the main falls, there is another  drop over a bulbous rock ledge.

The falls is visible from the West Fork Foss Lakes trail.

Middle Copper Falls

Middle Copper Falls is the second of the three Copper Falls. During normal flows, its two tiers are said to be extremely pretty. In flood, the falls becomes a single white sheet of water. The falls look very different from opposite banks of the stream.

Uniquely, the Foss River trail crosses the creek between Upper and Middle Copper Falls. Like Upper Copper Falls, several small paths lead down to Copper Creek, to places where one can view the falls.

Lower Copper Falls
Lower Copper Falls is a  drop through a narrow chute just downstream of the middle falls. However, it is not as easily viewed.

West Fork Foss River and Upper Valley
There are two major falls along the West Fork,

as well as one smaller tributary waterfall in the upper section of the valley.

Upper Foss River Falls

Lower Foss River Falls

Stairstep Falls
Stairstep Falls is a small, unspectacular waterfall on an unnamed stream flowing into the West Fork. Its name comes from the rock steps it flows over.

Lower Valley
There are two tall but volume-lacking, glacially fed cascades in the lower part of the valley.

Shoestring Falls

Sunray Falls

Above Delta Lake
Three large waterfalls flow from Big Heart, Angeline, and Otter lakes, and bear the same name.

Big Heart Falls

Angeline Falls

Otter Lake Falls
Otter Lake Falls is known to flow out of Otter Lake, which is adjacent to Angeline Lake.

See also
Alpine Lakes Wilderness Area

References

External links
West Fork Foss Lakes Trail

Waterfalls of King County, Washington